The Waverly, also known as the Anderson Boarding House, is a historic hotel building located at Hendersonville, Henderson County, North Carolina. It was built about 1898, and is a three-story, Queen Anne style frame building. It features a two-tiered sawnwork-trimmed porch and widow's walk. The building was expanded to three stories following a fire about 1910.  A one-story frame wing was added about 1940.

It was listed on the National Register of Historic Places in 1989.

References

External links

Waverly Inn website

Hotel buildings on the National Register of Historic Places in North Carolina
Neoclassical architecture in North Carolina
Hotel buildings completed in 1898
Buildings and structures in Henderson County, North Carolina
National Register of Historic Places in Henderson County, North Carolina
1898 establishments in North Carolina
Hendersonville, North Carolina